Okopy may refer to:
 Okopy, Ternopil Oblast (Ukraine)
Okopy, Lublin Voivodeship (east Poland)
Okopy, Podlaskie Voivodeship (north-east Poland)
Okopy, Masovian Voivodeship (east-central Poland)

See also
Okopy-Kolonia, Lublin Voivodeship, east Poland